Abiezer Coppe (1619 – 1672) was one of the English Ranters and a writer of prophetic religious pamphlets.

Biography

He was born in Warwick on May 20, 1619, and was a pupil of Thomas Dugard at The King's School, Warwick. From there he went to All Souls College, Oxford and also Merton College, Oxford.  One of Coppe's major works is the Fiery Flying Roll of 1649, a (highly heretical) tirade against inequality and hypocrisy which vividly evokes the charged and visionary atmosphere that swept over England during the civil war and interregnum.

While Coppe's views were unpopular with Royalists, they were equally disliked by Parliamentarians, and shortly after the Fiery Flying Roll was published he was imprisoned at Newgate Prison and the book burned.

Coppe was later released and celebrated by publishing Coppe's return to the ways of righteousness, in which he retracted his previous heresies, while adding a few more. Like Lodowick Muggleton and the Diggers' leader Gerrard Winstanley, Coppe combined an egalitarian social vision with an apocalyptic religious one.

In 1657 he apparently changed his name to Dr Higham, and was buried under that name at Barnes church on August 23, 1672.

Reception

Coppe has been written about by Norman Cohn, M.A. Poultney and the Marxist historians A. L. Morton and Christopher Hill.

He has also been celebrated in modern folk music; there is a folk song about him  with the eponymous title Abiezer Coppe on the Leon Rosselson album Love, Loneliness, Laundry, which has since been released on CD on Rosselson's compilation Guess What They're Selling At The Happiness Counter.
In 2018 the band Barnstormer 1649, led by poet Attila the Stockbroker, included a different song about Coppe with the same title on their album ‚Restoration Tragedy‘.

Coppe appears as a character in Caryl Churchill's 1976 play Light Shining in Buckinghamshire.

See also
Christian anarchism
English Dissenters
Religion in the United Kingdom

References
 Selected Writings, Abiezer Coppe, edited and introduced by Andrew Hopton. 1987, Aporia Press, London. 
 The Pursuit of the Millennium: Revolutionary Millenarians and Mystical Anarchists of the Middle Ages, Norman Cohn. 1957

Specific

External links

 "A Prophet of the Ranters"
 Excerpts from Coppe's works
 A Fiery Flying Roll and A Second Fiery Flying Roll at the Ex-Classics Web Site

English religious writers
People educated at Warwick School
1619 births
1672 deaths
Christian radicals
Alumni of Merton College, Oxford
Ranters